Red perch is a name used to refer to several species of fish:
Red gurnard perch (Helicolenus percoides)
Rose fish (Sebastes norvegicus, formerly Sebastes marinus)
Pacific ocean perch (Sebastes alutus)
Japanese red seaperch (Sebastes inermis)
Barber perch (Caesioperca rasor)
Bigeye sea perch (Helicolenus barathri)